This is a list of main roads and streets in Ipoh — the capital of the Perak state of Malaysia.  Like many city streets in Malaysia and Singapore, these were named after British colonial officers or adjacent landmarks in English.  Following the independence of Malaya in 1957 and the prescription of Malay as the country's national language, the city's streets were renamed after local politicians and royalty, with the Malay word jalan being used to indicate a main road.

The town is located on the Kinta River which was the main means of communication to the area until 1895 when the Kinta Valley Railway opened.  It grew up at the point on the river at which it ceased to be navigable and the landing stage was by an old upas tree from which the town took its name.  During the 1890s the town expanded rapidly from a market village to a booming mining town as large number of Chinese coolies came to the area to work the tin mines of the Kinta valley.  The only two roads initially in the area were the cart tracks linking the mines to the landing stages.  A wooden bridge was built across the Kinta river on the road to Gopeng which became Hugh Low Street.

Plots of land had been sold to the Chinese by the local land-owning aristocrat, the Dato Panglima Kinta, Mohamed Jusuf, who had laid them out with broad, straight streets but the rapid development had been disorderly so that the main road to Gopeng varied in width from 20 to 70 feet.  There was then a great fire on 1 June 1892, which destroyed much of the town's wooden buildings which had attap palm thatch roofs.  The reconstruction of the town was organised by the British Collector of Land Revenue, W.J.P. Hume, who straightened the road network, redrew the land boundaries and issued new title deeds.  He had no formal authority to do so but his influence and good sense made a success of the scheme.  The streets were now 50–60 feet wide, brick drains were laid and shade trees planted.

Roads

See also
 List of roads in Kuala Lumpur
 Street names of George Town, Penang
 Transportation in Seremban

References
Notes

Citations

Sources

External links
 Ipoh Street Names
 Ipoh Heritage Trail

Ipoh
Ipoh
Ipoh